The 1972 Grand National was the 126th renewal of the Grand National horse race that took place at Aintree near Liverpool, England, on 8 April 1972.
The winner was Well To Do, whose price went down from 33–1 to 14-1 the day before. Former winner Gay Trip was second, and there was a dead-heat for third place.

The winning colours of Capt Tim Forster were - crimson, gold sleeves, hooped cap.

Finishing order

Non-finishers

Media coverage

David Coleman presented Grand National Grandstand on the BBC for the thirteenth year (his twelfth). Peter O'Sullevan, John Hanmer (first National), and Julian Wilson formed the commentary team. The three of them would go on to cover 21 National's together. Peter Bromley remained the voice on BBC radio.

References

 1972
Grand National
Grand National
Grand National
20th century in Lancashire